Tambroni is a surname. Notable people with the surname include:

Fernando Tambroni (1901–1963), Italian politician
Clotilde Tambroni (1758–1817), Italian philologist

Italian-language surnames